Ann, Anne, Anna. Ana, or, variant, Regina; may refer to:

People
 Queen Anne (disambiguation) including Ann, Ana, Anna; for which "Anna Regina" (and "Anna R.") is Latin for "Anne the Queen" with Anne/Ana/Ann in Latin as Anna
 Anne Regina is Latin for "Anne the Queen". In Britain, this (and "Anne R.") was used by Anne, Queen of Great Britain
 Anne Régina Badet (1876–1949), French actress
 Ana Regina Cuarón, a Mexican actress-singer on Regina: Un Musical Para Una Nación Que Despierta musical play and album
 Sister Anne Regina Ennis (19th century), who re-founded the Altoona Sisters of Charity of Seton Hill as a separate entity from its original 1870 founding as a branch
 Dr. Anne Regina Douglas (21st century), who received an OBE at the 2012 Birthday Honours
 Ana Regina Quiñónez, high jump national record holder (set in 1991) for Guatemala; see List of Guatemalan records in athletics
 Anna Regina Studer (died 1876), daughter of U.S. artist Jacob H. Studer
 Anna Regina Svensson-Jacobsen (19th century), wife of Stillman Pond
 Anna-Regina Szternfinkiel (1920–1966), Polish-French author
 Anna Regina Tychsen (1853–1896), German-Danish ballet dancer

Fictional characters
 Ana Regina Rocio, a character from the Mexican telenovela Como dice el dicho, played by Lupita Jones in 2015

Places
 Anna Regina is the capital of the Pomeroon-Supenaam Region of Guyana
 Anna Regina Secondary School, Anna Regina, Pomeroon-Supenaam, Essequibo Coast, Guyana

Other uses
 "Anna Regina" (Wolf Hall), a 2015 series 1 episode 3 of the TV show Wolf Hall

See also

 Regina (disambiguation)
 Anna (disambiguation)
 Anne (disambiguation)
 Ann (disambiguation)
 Ana (disambiguation)